The Yekaterinoslav uezd was one of the subdivisions of the Yekaterinoslav Governorate of the Russian Empire. It was situated in the western part of the governorate. Its administrative centre was Yekaterinoslav (present-day Dnipro).

Demographics
At the time of the Russian Empire Census of 1897, Yekaterinoslavsky Uyezd had a population of 357,207. Of these, 55.7% spoke Ukrainian, 21.0% Russian, 13.0% Yiddish, 5.8% German, 2.2% Polish, 1.1% Belarusian, 0.5% Moldovan or Romanian, 0.2% Tatar, 0.1% Czech, 0.1% French and 0.1% Greek as their native language.

References

 
Uyezds of Yekaterinoslav Governorate
Yekaterinoslav Governorate